The 2018 Asian Men's Handball Championship was the 18th edition of the championship held under the aegis of Asian Handball Federation. The championship was hosted at Suwon, South Korea from 18 to 28 January 2018. It acted as the Asian qualifying tournament for the 2019 World Men's Handball Championship. For the first time, Australia, New Zealand and Bangladesh participated.

Qatar won their third title after defeating Bahrain 33–31 in the final.

Venues

Draw
The draw took place on 13 September 2017 at 11:00.

Iraq withdrew on 4 January 2018 due to unavoidable circumstances. Iraq's withdrawal left only two teams in Group A, therefore Uzbekistan was moved from Group B to Group A to balance the number of teams in each group.

Referees
The following ten referee pairs were selected.

Preliminary round
All times are local (UTC+9).

Group A

Group B

Group C

Group D

Classement round

Group 3

Group 4

Placement matches

13th place game

Eleventh place game

Ninth place game

Main round

Group 1

Group 2

Knockout stage

Bracket

Semifinals

Seventh place game

Fifth place game

Third place game

Final

Final standing

References

External links
AHF website
Results at todor66

2018
Asian Men's Handball Championship
Asian Men's Handball Championship
2018 Handball Asian Men's Championship
January 2018 sports events in South Korea